Aphoebantini is a tribe of bee flies in the family Bombyliidae. There are about 5 genera and at least 80 described species in Aphoebantini.

Genera
 Aphoebantus Loew, 1872 i c g b
 Cononedys Hermann, 1907
 Epacmus Osten-Sacken, 1887 i c g b
 Eucessia Coquillett, 1886 i c g b
 ExepacmusCoquillett, 1894 i c g
 Pteraulacodes Hesse, 1956
 Pteraulax Bezzi, 1921
Data sources: i = ITIS, c = Catalogue of Life, g = GBIF, b = Bugguide.net

References

Further reading

External links

 

Bombyliidae
Articles created by Qbugbot
Brachycera tribes